The Stoll Bottling Works is a historic building located in Boone, Iowa, United States. The  brick building was built between 1913 and 1914. It was one of the buildings in town that housed a plant for producing and bottling carbonated soft drinks, a significant industry in Boone. Louis Stoll had begun working at the Selling Soda Company when he was a teenager. He bought the company in 1912 when he was 21. Four years later his former supervisor at Selling, Frank Linderblood, bought the company and Stoll moved to Des Moines where he owned Capitol City Bottling Works. By the mid-20th century the national brands had plants in Boone. This building was listed on the National Register of Historic Places in 1989. It mistakenly lists this building as the Stoll Building Works.

References

Industrial buildings completed in 1914
Boone, Iowa
Industrial buildings and structures on the National Register of Historic Places in Iowa
National Register of Historic Places in Boone County, Iowa
Buildings and structures in Boone County, Iowa